"How Come" is a song recorded by Australian rock band The Sports. The song was written by band members Stephen Cummings
and Andrew Pendlebury. Released in March 1981 as the lead single from the band's fourth studio album, Sondra (1981), the song peaked at number 21 on the Australian Kent Music Report, becoming the band's highest charting single.

Track listing
 Australian 7" single (K 8237)
Side A "How Come" - 3:10
Side B "Drug Sluts" - 3:39

Charts

References

1971 songs
1981 singles
The Sports songs
Mushroom Records singles
Songs written by Stephen Cummings